Callicore is a genus of nymphalid butterfly found in the Neotropical realm. This genus, like some related ones, was formerly lumped together as the paraphyletic Catagramma assemblage.

Species in this genus are commonly called eighty-eights or numberwings like the related genera Diaethria and Perisama, in reference to the characteristic patterns on the hindwing undersides of many. In Callicore, the pattern consists of bluish dots surrounded by black and looks more like "αB" or "8°", though some members of this genus have a completely different arrangement of dots. The forewing undersides vary little between species, being black with one or two broad orange-yellow bands in the basal part and one thin and one very faint yellowish band near the apex.

C. hydarnis is listed as an endangered species in Minas Gerais, Brazil.

Species
Listed alphabetically within species groups:

The atacama species group:
 Callicore atacama (Hewitson, 1852) – yellow-banded eighty-eight
 Callicore felderi (Hewitson, 1864) – 8-spot numberwing
 Callicore hesperis (Guérin, 1844) – hesperis eighty-eight

The cyllene species group:
 Callicore pygas (Godart, [1824]) – pygas eighty-eight

The cynosura species group:
 Callicore astarte (Cramer, 1779) – Astarte eighty-eight
 Callicore cynosura (Doubleday & Hewitson, 1847) – Cynosura eighty-eight
 Callicore excelsior (Hewitson, 1857) – excelsior eighty-eight or superb numberwing
 Callicore ines (Hopp, 1922)
 Callicore sorana (Godart, 1832) – Sorana eighty-eight

The hydarnis species group
Callicore hydarnis (Godart, [1824])

The hydaspes species group:
 Callicore brome (Doyère, [1840]) – four-spotted eighty-eight
 Callicore hydaspes (Drury, 1782) – Hydaspes eighty-eight
 Callicore lyca (Doubleday, [1847]) – Aegina numberwing
 Callicore maronensis (Oberthür, 1916)

The  species group:
 Callicore cyclops (Staudinger, 1891)
 Callicore  (Latreille, 1811) – two-eyed eighty-eight

The texa species group:
 Callicore texa (Hewitson, 1854) – Texa eighty-eight

The tolima species group:
 Callicore eunomia (Hewitson, 1853) – Eunomia eighty-eight
 Callicore hystaspes (Fabricius, 1781) – Hystaspes eighty-eight
 Callicore tolima (Hewitson, 1851) – blue-and-orange eighty-eight

Gallery

References

 Casagrande, M. M., Mielke, O. H. H., & Brown, K. S., Jr. (1998). Butterflies (Lepidoptera) considered as threatened in Minas Gerais, Brazil (in Portuguese). Revista Brasileira de Zoologia, 15(1), 241-259.
 Garwood, K. M., Lehman, Carter, W., & Carter, G. (2007). Butterflies of Southern Amazonia. Mission, Texas: Neotropical Butterflies.
 Lamas, G., ed. 2004. Atlas of Neotropical Lepidoptera. Checklist: Part 4A Hesperioidea-Papilionoidea. Gainesville: Scientific Publishers/Association of Tropical Lepidoptera.

External links 

images representing Callicore at Consortium for the Barcode of Life
Callicore Tree of Life
Pteron in Japanese but with binomial names.

Biblidinae
Nymphalidae of South America
Nymphalidae genera
Taxa named by Jacob Hübner